James Larkin Pearson (September 13, 1879 – August 27, 1981) was a poet and newspaper publisher. From 1953–1981 he served as North Carolina Poet Laureate, and was the second poet to hold the title.

Background
Pearson was born on September 13, 1879 in the Brushy Mountains of Wilkes County, North Carolina. He was born in a log cabin on his parents’ farm. According to Pearson in his book My Fingers and My Toes, his first attempt at poetry came when he was about four years old: "One cold winter day my father had me out with him and asked me, "Jimmy, are you cold?" Without taking any time to study out my answer, it came like a flash: "My fingers and my toes, my feet and my hands, are just as cold, as you'd ever see a man's." From this point, Larkin wrote, he wanted to be a poet. He was a poor student in school and wrote that he "was set down as a hopeless case...quit school entirely at 16, having never been in school more than 12 months, from first to last." However, he continued to educate himself, even when he was plowing on the family farm: "I always carried my notebook and my pencil with me, and as I trudged between the plow-handles in the hot sunshine, my mind was busy working out a poem." Pearson worked on the family farm until he was 21.

Career
In 1900 Pearson began working with R. Don Laws on The Yellow Jacket, a newspaper which was distributed nationally and known for its radical political views, such as espousing socialism. In 1910 Pearson began publishing his own newspaper, entitled The Fool-Killer. The paper was sold nationwide and at its height had over 50,000 subscribers. The paper's masthead showed an explosion blowing up the "drunken fool", "religious fool", "society fool", and the "political fool." Larkin wrote that "from the seclusion of these wooded hills will go forth a bundle of literary dynamite that will shake the rotten foundations of society...[The Fool-Killer] is salted with wit, peppered with humor, and seasoned with sarcasm." Larkin wrote the paper's editorials and included a good deal of his poetry in the paper. He used his paper to promote liberal economic policies and politicians who supported those policies, such as President Franklin D. Roosevelt and his New Deal programs. A teetotaler, Pearson also supported the policy of prohibition in The Fool-Killer. He stopped publishing the paper in 1935 following the death of his first wife, Cora Wallace, in 1934. In 1924 he printed a book of his poetry which he called Pearson's Poems and stated in the preface, "It was a rather big undertaking for me with my limited facilities and the work is not as perfect as a professional book-maker could have done.  But it is fairly presentable anyhow, and I am rather pleased with it.  Possibly the fact that I printed it with my own hands will be of some interest to the reader." In addition to My Fingers and My Toes, some of Pearson's many books of poetry are Fifty Acres and Other Selected Poems, Plowed Ground, and Early Harvest. Pearson's poetry often focused upon farming and other aspects of rural life and country living in the late 19th and early 20th centuries.

On August 4, 1953 North Carolina Governor William B. Umstead appointed Pearson as North Carolina's second Poet Laureate. He kept this title until his death. His functions as poet laureate included reading poems at the inaugural ceremonies of North Carolina's Governors and promoting interest in poetry at schools, colleges, and universities across the state. Pearson was scheduled to appear on the Johnny Carson Show, but upon learning that Pearson was hard of hearing, the show canceled, stating "we can't have Johnny yelling at an old man on the television." Among the memorials to Pearson is the James Larkin Pearson Award in free-verse poetry; the award is presented annually by the Poetry Council of North Carolina. The library at Wilkes Community College in Wilkesboro, North Carolina is also named in Pearson's honor, and contains many of his personal papers.

Family life
In May 1907 Pearson married Cora Wallace. She died in 1934 of an asthma attack while in Pearson's arms. He remarried, this time to Eleanor Fox, in 1939. She died in 1963. He did not remarry after his second wife's death. Pearson had two children: Agnes, who was adopted, and another daughter, who was stillborn. For most of his adult life Pearson lived on his farm, called "Fifty Acres", in Boomer, North Carolina. He eventually died on August 27, 1981, at the age of 101.

References
 Welborn, Ken. "Sometimes treasures just walk through the front door…", Wilkes Record, 15 February 2006.
 "James Larkin Pearson 1879–1981, Biographical and Historical Note", James Larkin Pearson Library, Wilkes Community College. Retrieved 14 May 2008.

External links 
 The fool-killer. Volume X (Boomer, N.C.), 01 Feb. 1920. Chronicling America: Historic American Newspapers. Lib. of Congress.

1879 births
1981 deaths
People from Wilkes County, North Carolina
American male poets
Poets Laureate of North Carolina
Poets from North Carolina
American centenarians
Men centenarians